Ecola State Park is a state park located approximately 3 miles north of Cannon Beach in Clatsop County in the U.S. state of Oregon on the Oregon Coast. It is administered by the Oregon Parks and Recreation Department.

The park encompasses  of coastline between Cannon Beach and Seaside and includes Tillamook Head. In 1806, William Clark and other members of the Corps of Discovery traveled through the area in search of a beached whale and saw burial canoes of the Tillamook; the park is included as part of Lewis and Clark National Historical Park, though separate entrance fees are charged. Archaeological sites within the park dating to as early as  have revealed much about the Tillamook. Scenes from several movies have been filmed at Indian Beach and other park locations.

Archaeology
Multiple archaeological sites located within park boundaries were added to the National Register of Historic Places in 1997.

Bald Point Site
The Bald Point Site (Smithsonian trinomial: 35CLT23) features a shell midden and possible house pit, dating to ca. . Associated with the Tillamook people, it has the potential to yield information related to environmental change in the Oregon Coast region, settlement and subsistence patterns, emergence of ethnographic patterns among coastal people, baseline cultural patterns prior to the arrival of European Americans, and other topics. Parts of the site have been lost to coastal erosion since the first scientific investigations in 1976, but the remaining portions appear mostly secure.

Ecola Point Site
At the Ecola Point Site (Smithsonian trinomial: 35CLT21), several ground depressions have been interpreted by researchers as house pits, indicating the presence of a semipermanent village. Two dense shell middens have preserved extensive faunal remains, along with other artifacts. Radiocarbon dates taken at the site roughly span a period from ca. 1100 CE to ca. 1700 CE. The site has the potential to yield information related to environmental change in the Oregon Coast region, settlement and subsistence patterns, emergence of ethnographic patterns among coastal people, the change in cultural patterns from before to after contact with European Americans, and other topics.

Filming location	
Much of the 1985 film The Goonies was filmed within the park, as was the school picnic scene in Kindergarten Cop. Indian Beach was the filming location for the time-jumping final act of Point Break, and several scenes of Twilight. The park also appeared in Free Willy including several scenes where it served as the exterior background of the Northwest Adventure Park's aquatic theater. In reality, the tank was filmed at the former Reino Aventura in Tlalpan, Mexico.

See also
Lewis and Clark Expedition
List of Oregon state parks
National Register of Historic Places listings in Clatsop County, Oregon

References

State parks of Oregon
Oregon Coast
Historical Parks
Parks in Clatsop County, Oregon
National Register of Historic Places in Clatsop County, Oregon
Native American Archeological Sites of the Oregon Coast MPS